The Moderator of the General Assembly of the Church of Scotland is the minister or elder chosen to moderate (chair) the annual General Assembly of the Church of Scotland, which is held for a week in Edinburgh every year. After chairing the Assembly, the Moderator then spends the following year representing the Church of Scotland at civic events, and visiting congregations and projects in Scotland and beyond. Because the Church of Scotland is Scotland's national church, and a presbyterian church has no bishops, the Moderator is – arguably alongside the Lord High Commissioner to the General Assembly of the Church of Scotland – the most prominent figure in the life of Church of Scotland adherents.

Office
The moderator is normally a minister or elder of considerable experience and held in high esteem in the Church of Scotland. The moderator is nominated by the "Committee to Nominate the Moderator", which consists of fifteen people elected annually by the General Assembly. The moderator must, however, also be formally elected by the commissioners (i.e. all representatives) at the start of the General Assembly – this is in practice a formality.

The office is held for one year only. Following the week of the General Assembly, the moderator effectively acts as an ambassador for the Church of Scotland, frequently being invited to represent the Church at official events or at special services for congregations.

In 2004 Alison Elliot became the first woman (and first elder for approximately 400 years) to be elected Moderator. Three years later Sheilagh M. Kesting became the first woman minister to be elected to the office.

If the moderator is a minister, he or she is styled the Right Reverend during the term of office and the Very Reverend thereafter.  This gives no further status beyond that of teaching elder.

Official residence
The Moderator has an official residence at Number 2 Rothesay Terrace in Edinburgh's West End.

Role in coronations
The Moderator first took part in the Coronation of the British monarch in 1953. The then-Moderator, James Pitt-Watson, presented a Bible to Queen Elizabeth II, saying: "Here is wisdom; This is the royal law; These are the lively Oracles of God."

Coat of arms

The Moderator of the General Assembly of the Church of Scotland has an official coat of arms awarded by the Lord Lyon King of Arms. It includes a shield showing the burning bush, plus the Quigrich - the crozier of St Fillan - behind the shield (with the curved head of the Quigrich visible above the shield). The shield is surmounted by a black Geneva bonnet - closely associated with John Knox. Similar to the coat of arms of an archbishop, there are the addition of twenty blue tassels arranged with ten on each side.

Order of precedence
By virtue of an Order of Precedence established by King Edward VII the Moderator ranks immediately after a sheriff principal in the sheriff principal's own sheriffdom.

List of Moderators

Since 2010, the following have been elected to the position of Moderator:

 2010: John Christie 
 2011: A. David K. Arnott 
 2012: Albert Bogle 
 2013: E. Lorna Hood 
 2014: Angus Morrison; initially nominated but withdrew on health grounds
 2014: John Chalmers
 2015: Angus Morrison 
 2016: Russell Barr 
 2017: Dr Derek Browning
 2018: Susan M. Brown
 2019: Colin Sinclair
 2020: Martin Fair
 2021: The Lord Wallace of Tankerness
 2022: Dr Iain Greenshields

See also
Moderator of the General Assembly

References

External links
Church of Scotland official website

Church of Scotland
Ecclesiastical titles